Malkapur Assembly constituency is one of the seven constituencies of Maharashtra Legislative Assembly located in the Buldhana district.

It is a part of the Raver Lok Sabha constituency in the adjoining Jalgaon district along with five other assembly constituencies, viz Chopda, Raver, Bhusawal, Jamner and Muktainagar. Hence it is not a part of Buldhana (Lok Sabha constituency) consisting of the remaining six constituencies of the Buldhana district, viz Buldhana, Chikhli, Sindkhed Raja, Mehkar, Khamgaon and Jalgaon(Jamod).

As of 2008, the extent of the constituency is the entire Nandura taluka and Malkapur taluka.

Members of Legislative Assembly

Election Results

2019

See also
 Nandura
 Malkapur, Buldhana

Notes

Assembly constituencies of Maharashtra
Buldhana district